Asen may refer to:

Places
 Asen (state), a polity involved in late 17th-century wars in modern Ghana
 Asen, Stara Zagora Province, a village in Pavel Banya Municipality, Bulgaria

Other
 Asen dynasty, a dynasty which ruled the Second Bulgarian Empire between 1187 and 1280
 Asen (vodun), metal objects that attract the spirits of the dead associated with West African Vodun (voodoo)
 Asen, Asena or Ashina, the ruling dynasty of the ancient Turks in mid 6th century
 "Asen", an archaic unit of measurement (also aasen, aces), used to value tulips, during the tulip mania
 Jaime Asensio de la Fuente (b. 1978), Spanish footballer known as Asen
 , a training ship of the Bulgarian navy; see List of Bulgarian military equipment of World War II

Acronym
 Association for the Study of Ethnicity and Nationalism
 Australian Student Environment Network

See also
 Åsen (disambiguation)
 Aasen (disambiguation)
 Assen (disambiguation)
 Azen (disambiguation)